Stephanie Mills is a character from the 1970s American television situation comedy All in the Family and the follow-up series Archie Bunker's Place. She was portrayed by child actress Danielle Brisebois, who joined All in the Family in 1978. Brisebois continued in the role until Archie Bunker's Place ended its run in 1983.

Character background
Stephanie was introduced in the All in the Family's ninth-season premiere as the 9-year-old niece of Archie and Edith Bunker (although she was actually the daughter of Edith's step-cousin). Stephanie was abandoned at the doorstep of the Bunkers' home by her father Floyd Mills, a chronic alcoholic. Floyd was Edith's step-cousin from her aunt's second marriage. Stephanie's mother — Floyd's wife, Marilyn — had died some time earlier in a car accident.

Edith is more than delighted to take in Stephanie, but Archie is decidedly less so, especially since he was finally looking forward to some peace and quiet after his daughter and son-in-law, Gloria and Mike "Meathead" Stivic, moved to California. Eventually, Stephanie wins over Archie, and he grows to love her as his own daughter. She also appeared to hold liberal views in contrast with the conservative Archie. Shortly after moving in with the Bunkers, Stephanie reveals herself to be Jewish, something that at first upsets Archie. While he learns to live with Stephanie's religious beliefs, Archie was not stopped from making his usual bigoted remarks against Judaism from time to time. 

Stephanie proved to be very talented as a singer and dancer, showcasing her talents on several episodes of All in the Family and Archie Bunker's Place. She once applied to a fine arts school (despite Archie's decidedly reluctant support), but she was turned down because of her less-than-stellar grades.

On several occasions, Stephanie's relatives tried to take Stephanie away from the Bunkers. Not long after Edith died, Stephanie's wealthy grandmother Estelle Harris (portrayed by Celeste Holm) sued Archie for custody, citing his bigoted attitudes and blue-collar background. A judge sides with Archie, but grants Estelle liberal visitation rights. Stephanie's father Floyd (Ben Slack) also re-appears on occasion, asking to take his daughter back (in once instance, extorting money from Archie and Edith in exchange for allowing them to keep Stephanie); however, the Bunkers manage to foil him each time.

Stephanie first attended an unnamed elementary school and later Ditmars Junior High School. Her best friend (and sometimes rival) was classmate Amy Bloom (played by Seven Anne MacDonald).

In the latter years of Archie Bunker's Place, Stephanie would be one of two teenaged girls living under Archie's roof, the other being Archie's 18-year-old niece Barbara Lee "Billie" Bunker (portrayed by Denise Miller). Stephanie would also make fewer appearances during the final two seasons of the series.

See also
All in the Family
Archie Bunker's Place
Danielle Brisebois

References

Bibliography
 Brooks, Tim and Earl Marsh. The Complete Directory to Prime Time Network and Cable TV Shows, 9th Ed. Ballantine Books, Random House, New York City, New York, 2007. 
 Terrace, Vincent. Television Character and Story Facts: Over 110,000 Details From 1,008 Shows, 1945–1992. McFarland & Co. Inc., Jefferson, North Carolina, 1993.

External links

All in the Family characters
Fictional American Jews
Fictional orphans
Fictional singers
Fictional dancers
Child characters in television
Television characters introduced in 1978